Stygionympha is a butterfly genus from the subfamily Satyrinae in the family Nymphalidae.

Species
Stygionympha curlei Henning & Henning, 1996
Stygionympha dicksoni (Riley, 1938)
Stygionympha geraldi Pennington, 1970
Stygionympha irrorata (Trimen, 1873)
Stygionympha robertsoni (Riley, 1932)
Stygionympha scotina Quickelberge, 1977
Stygionympha vansoni (Pennington, 1953)
Stygionympha vigilans (Trimen, 1887)
Stygionympha wichgrafi van Son, 1955

External links 
 "Stygionympha van Son, 1955" at Markku Savela's Lepidoptera and Some Other Life Forms

Satyrini
Butterfly genera